S. spinosa may refer to:
 Saccharopolyspora spinosa, a bacterium species in the genus Saccharopolyspora
 Scaphiophryne spinosa, a frog species
 Seddera spinosa, a plant species endemic to Yemen
 Sida spinosa, a plant species in the genus Sida endemic to Hawaii
 Smilax spinosa, a climbing flowering plant species in the genus Smilax
 Stasina spinosa, a spider species in the genus Stasina
 Stephanomeria spinosa, a wirelettuce species in the genus Stephanomeria
 Strychnos spinosa, a tree species

See also
 Spinosa (disambiguation)